Kapulivka is a village of historical significance in Nikopol Raion of Dnipropetrovsk Oblast in Ukraine. It belongs to Pokrovske rural hromada, one of the hromadas of Ukraine. The population is 2,053.

Geography 
Kapulivka is situated on the right bank of the Kakhovka Reservoir. The distance to the raion center is about 20 km and passes by the N23 highway.

History 
Kapulivka is a place where the Chortomlyk Sich was established in 1652 by kish otaman Fedir Lutay.

A legendary kish otaman of the Zaporozhian Host Ivan Sirko was buried in Kapulivka in 1680.

References 

Villages in Nikopol Raion
Populated places on the Dnieper in Ukraine